The Zwickau model is an inversion of the Karlsruhe model, with diesel main-line trains extended through city streets on tram tracks. It is so called because the German city of Zwickau was the first to introduce the concept in 1999. 

Die Länderbahn in Zwickau utilizes dual-gauge track to maintain compatibility with the city's tramway network, but that is not a necessary feature of the model.

See also
 Weymouth Harbour Tramway
 Street running train
 Tram-train, an inverse concept

Passenger rail transport in Germany
Rail transport operations
Transport in Saxony
Zwickau